Gary Duane Beisbier (born July 3, 1945) is an American songwriter, arranger and musician best known for co-writing hit songs for The Buckinghams. Gary is a founding member of the rhythm and blues horn rock band from Chicago, Illinois, The Mob.

Early Years

Gary grew up in a house surrounded by music. His sister played the flute, one of his brothers played trumpet while another older brother played guitar. In grade school, he took lessons on the clarinet and started doubling on saxophone in Junior High. Gary liked the good stuff in many genres, big band and small combo jazz, classical standards, pop, and musical theater.

Gary went to West Aurora High School in Illinois. During those high school years emerged the band “The Maybees”, his first exposure to playing rock ’n’ roll at the age of 15. They played many teen dances, called record hops at that time, and various other weekend engagements in the Chicago suburbs. By the time graduation rolled around the group had also released three 45s on Terry Records. Beisbier went on to college at Northern Illinois University where he was active in the music program.

Career
Gary Beisbier and Jim Holvay co-wrote the hit songs Don't You Care, Hey Baby (They're Playing Our Song) and Susan for The Buckinghams in the late 1960s while they were in The Mob. The Mob played to packed venues and their showmanship and talent pleased the audiences to the limit.
Gary was a multi-talented musician and played several different instruments in the Mob. He was the band's arranger for most of the charts and presentation of the Mob in concert.
The songwriting team of Beisbier and Holvay produced two more top 100 Billboard-charting songs on the Colossus record label produced by Jerry Ross (record producer) in 1971. "I Dig Everything About You" peaked at #83 on the charts. It became a beach music classic. "Give It To Me" later charted at #71 on the Billboard top 100 chart.

"A Little of This, A Little of That" by Gary Beisbier was released Jul 01, 2014 by CD Baby.

"A Little More of This and That" by Gary Beisbier was released Aug 09, 2019 by CD Baby.

References

External References
Discogs.com 
allmusic.com
badcatrecords.com
CD Universe.com
A Little of This, A Little of That © Copyright - Gary Beisbier / Gary Beisbier (888295102742)
A Little More of This and That © Copyright - Gary  / Gary  (888295922364)

Living people
Songwriters from Illinois
American rock singers
Singers from Chicago
1945 births
20th-century American singers
21st-century American saxophonists
20th-century American male singers
21st-century American male singers
21st-century American singers
People from Aurora, Illinois
American male songwriters